First Baptist Church may refer to:

Canada
First Baptist Church (Toronto), Ontario
First Baptist Church (Ottawa), Ontario

 First Baptist Church (Halifax), Nova Scotia, involved in the founding of Acadia University

United States

Alabama
First Baptist Church (Bay Minette, Alabama), listed on the National Register of Historic Places in Baldwin County
First Baptist Church, East Thomas, listed on the NRHP in Birmingham
Gardendale First Baptist Church (Gardendale, Alabama), a Southern Baptist megachurch in Gardendale
First Baptist Church (Greenville, Alabama), listed on the NRHP in Butler County
First Baptist Church (Huntsville, Alabama), a Baptist church on the NRHP in Alabama
First Baptist Church (Jasper, Alabama), a Southern Baptist church in Jasper
First Baptist Church, Kingston, listed on the NRHP in Birmingham
First Baptist Church (Montgomery, Alabama), also known as the Brick-A-Day Church
First Baptist Church (South Perry Street, Montgomery, Alabama), a Baptist church and historic landmark
First Baptist Church (Selma, Alabama), listed on the NRHP in Dallas County
First Baptist Church of Wetumpka, listed on the NRHP in Elmore County

Arizona
First Baptist Church (Casa Grande, Arizona), listed on the NRHP in Pinal County
First Baptist Church (Flagstaff, Arizona), listed on the NRHP in Coconino County
First Baptist Church (Phoenix, Arizona), listed on the NRHP in Phoenix

Arkansas
First Baptist Church (Eudora, Arkansas), listed on the NRHP in Chicot County
First Baptist Church (Little Rock, Arkansas), listed on the NRHP in Little Rock
First Baptist Church (Marvell, Arkansas), listed on the NRHP in Phillips County
First Baptist Church of Springdale, a Southern Baptist church and the largest church in Arkansas

California
First Baptist Church (Bakersfield, California), listed on the NRHP in Kern County
First Baptist Church (Boron, California), Kern County
First Baptist Church of Los Angeles, designated Los Angeles Historic Cultural Monument 237 in 1981
First Baptist Church of Orange, listed on the NRHP in Orange County
First Baptist Church (Ukiah, California), an Evangelical Protestant church

Colorado
First Baptist Church (Alamosa, Colorado), listed on the NRHP in Alamosa County
First Baptist Church of Boulder, listed on the NRHP in Boulder
First Baptist Church of Denver, listed on the NRHP in downtown Denver
First Baptist Church (Greeley, Colorado), listed on the NRHP in Weld County
First Baptist Church (Trinidad, Colorado), listed on the NRHP in Las Animas County

Connecticut
First Baptist Church (Bridgeport, Connecticut), listed on the NRHP in Bridgeport
First Baptist Church (Hartford, Connecticut) also known as the First Cathedral

Florida
First Baptist Church (Jacksonville, Florida), in Downtown Jacksonville
First Baptist Church (Lake Wales, Florida), listed on the NRHP in Polk County
First Baptist Church (Madison, Florida), listed on the NRHP in Madison County

First Baptist Church (Trenton, Florida), Gilchrist County

Georgia
First Baptist Church (Atlanta), a megachurch in Dunwoody
First Baptist Church (Augusta, Georgia), a former Baptist church and historic site listed on the NRHP in Richmond County
First Baptist Church (Columbus, Georgia), part of Church Square which is listed on the NRHP in Muscogee County
First Baptist Church (Panama City, Florida), megachurch in Bay County
First Baptist Church (Savannah, Georgia)
First Baptist Church (Woodstock, Georgia), a megachurch in Cherokee County

Idaho
First Baptist Church of Emmett, Emmett, Idaho, listed on the NRHP in Gem County
Jerome First Baptist Church, listed on the NRHP in Jerome County

Indiana
First Baptist Church (Columbus, Indiana), listed on the NRHP in Bartholomew County
First Baptist Church (Hammond, Indiana), an Independent Baptist church in Lake County
First Baptist Church (Muncie, Indiana), listed on the NRHP in Delaware County

First Baptist Church (Salem, Indiana), listed on the NRHP in Washington County
First Baptist Church (West Baden Springs, Indiana), listed on the NRHP in Orange County, Indiana

Iowa
First Baptist Church (Davenport, Iowa), listed on the NRHP in Scott County
First Baptist Church of West Union, listed on the NRHP in Fayette County
First Baptist Church Oskaloosa, Iowa

Kansas
 First Baptist Church (Council Grove, Kansas), listed on the NRHP in Kansas

Kentucky
First Baptist Church (Elizabethtown, Kentucky), listed on the NRHP in Hardin County

First Baptist Church (Frankfort, Kentucky), Franklin County
First Baptist Church (Murray, Kentucky), listed on the NRHP in Calloway County

First Baptist Church (Owensboro, Kentucky), listed on the NRHP in Daviess County
First Baptist Church (Paintsville, Kentucky), listed on the NRHP in Johnson County

Maine
First Baptist Church of Bowdoin and Coombs Cemetery, listed on the NRHP in Sagadahoc County
First Baptist Church (East Lamoine, Maine), listed on the NRHP in Hancock County
First Baptist Church (Portland, Maine), listed on the NRHP in Cumberland County
First Baptist Church (Sedgwick, Maine), listed on the NRHP in Hancock County
First Baptist Church, Former (Skowhegan, Maine), listed on the NRHP in Somerset County
First Baptist Church (Waterboro, Maine), listed on the NRHP in York County
First Baptist Church (Waterville, Maine), listed on the NRHP in Kennebec County

Maryland
First Baptist Church (Cumberland, Maryland), listed on the NRHP in Allegany County

Massachusetts
First Baptist Church (Boston, Massachusetts), a National Historic Landmark in the city of Boston
First Baptist Church (Cambridge, Massachusetts), listed on the NRHP in Middlesex County
First Baptist Church (Fall River, Massachusetts), listed on the NRHP in Bristol County
First Baptist Church (Framingham, Massachusetts), listed on the NRHP in Middlesex County
First Baptist Church of Medfield, listed on the NRHP for Norfolk County
First Baptist Church (Methuen, Massachusetts), listed on the NRHP in Essex County
First Baptist Church (New Bedford, Massachusetts), listed on the NRHP in Bristol County
First Baptist Church in Newton (Massachusetts), listed on the NRHP in Middlesex County
First Baptist Church (Stoneham, Massachusetts), listed on the NRHP in Middlesex County
First Baptist Church and Society, Swansea, listed on the NRHP in Bristol County
First Baptist Church of Wollaston, listed on the NRHP in Norfolk County

Michigan
First Baptist Church (Detroit, Michigan), listed on the NRHP in Wayne County
First Baptist Church of Grand Blanc, listed on the NRHP in Genesee County
First Baptist Church (Lansing, Michigan), listed on the NRHP in Ingham County

Minnesota
First Baptist Church (Garden City, Minnesota), listed on the NRHP in Blue Earth County
First Baptist Church (Minneapolis), at Saint Anthony Falls
First Baptist Church (Saint Paul, Minnesota), listed on the NRHP in St. Paul

Mississippi
First Baptist Church of Biloxi, Harrison County

Missouri
First Baptist Church (Columbia, Missouri), Boone County
First Baptist Church City of St. Louis, founded as First African Baptist Church

Montana
First Baptist Church (Bozeman, Montana), listed on the NRHP in Gallatin County
First Baptist Church (Hardin, Montana), listed on the NRHP in Big Horn County
First Baptist Church (Helena, Montana), Lewis and Clark County
First Baptist Church (Great Falls, Montana), on Interstate 15 Business
First Baptist Church (Stevensville, Montana), listed on the NRHP in Ravalli County

Nebraska
First Baptist Church (Red Cloud, Nebraska), listed on the NRHP in Webster County

New Hampshire
First Baptist Church of Cornish, listed on the NRHP for Sullivan County
First Baptist Church of Gilmanton, or Lower Gilmanton Church, listed on the NRHP in Belknap County

New Jersey
First Baptist Church (Hoboken, New Jersey), listed on the NRHP in Hudson County

New Mexico
First Baptist Church (Las Vegas, New Mexico), listed on the NRHP in San Miguel County

New York
First Baptist Church of Camillus, listed on the NRHP in Onondaga County
First Baptist Church and Cook Memorial Building, Carthage, listed on the NRHP in Hudson County
First Baptist Church (Charleston, New York), listed on the NRHP in Montgomery County
First Baptist Church of Cold Spring (Nelsonville, New York), listed on the NRHP in Putnam County
First Baptist Church of Deerfield, listed on the NRHP in Oneida County
First Baptist Church of Fairport, listed on the NRHP in Monroe County
First Baptist Church (Brockport, New York), listed on the NRHP in Monroe County
First Baptist Church (Geneva, New York), listed on the NRHP in Ontario County
First Baptist Church of Interlaken, listed on the NRHP in Seneca County
First Baptist Church (Moravia, New York), NRHP-listed in Church Street-Congress Street Historic District, in Cayuga County
First Baptist Church (Newfane, New York), listed on the NRHP in Niagara County
First Baptist Church in the City of New York, Manhattan
First Baptist Church of Ossining, listed on the NRHP in Steuben County
First Baptist Church of Painted Post, listed on the NRHP in Steuben County
First Baptist Church of Phelps, listed on the NRHP in Ontario County
First Baptist Church (Poughkeepsie, New York), listed on the NRHP in Dutchess County
First Baptist Church (Sandy Creek, New York), listed on the NRHP in Oswego County
First Baptist Church of Tarrytown, listed on the NRHP in Westchester County, New York
First Baptist Church of Watkins Glen, listed on the NRHP in Schuyler County
First Baptist Church of Weedsport, listed on the NRHP in Cayuga County

North Carolina
First Baptist Church (Andrews, North Carolina), listed on the NRHP in Cherokee County
First Baptist Church (Asheville, North Carolina), listed on the NRHP in Buncombe County
First Baptist Church (Burlington, North Carolina), listed on the NRHP in Buncombe County
First Baptist Church (Eden, North Carolina), listed on the NRHP in Rockingham County
First Baptist Church (Fayetteville, North Carolina), listed on the NRHP in Cumberland County
First Baptist Church (High Point, North Carolina), listed on the NRHP in Guilford County
First Baptist Church (Kernersville, North Carolina), listed on the NRHP in Forsyth County
First Baptist Church (Lincolnton, North Carolina), listed on the NRHP in Lincoln County
First Baptist Church (Madison, North Carolina), Rockingham County
First Baptist Church (New Bern, North Carolina), listed on the NRHP in Craven County
First Baptist Church (Raleigh, North Carolina), listed on the NRHP in Wake County
First Baptist Church (Reidsville, North Carolina), listed on the NRHP in Rockingham County
First Baptist Church (Wilmington, North Carolina), listed on the NRHP in New Hanover County

Ohio
First Baptist Church (Vermilion, Ohio), listed on the NRHP in Ohio

Oklahoma
First Baptist Church (Colored), listed on the NRHP in Anadarko, Caddo County
First Baptist Church (Muskogee, Oklahoma), listed on the NRHP in Muskogee County

Oregon
First Baptist Church (Ashland, Oregon), listed on the NRHP in Jackson County
First Baptist Church of Brownsville, listed on the NRHP in Lin County
First Baptist Church (Dayton, Oregon), listed on the NRHP in Yamhill County

Pennsylvania
First Baptist Church (Philadelphia), founded in 1698

Rhode Island
First Baptist Church in America, a National Historic Landmark in Providence

South Carolina
First Baptist Church (Charleston, South Carolina), Charleston County
First Baptist Church (Columbia, South Carolina), a National Historic Landmark in Richland County
First Baptist Church (Darlington, South Carolina), listed on the NRHP in Darlington County

South Dakota
First Baptist Church of Vermillion, listed on the NRHP in Clay County

Tennessee
First Baptist Church (Chattanooga, Tennessee), listed on the NRHP in Hamilton County
First Baptist Church Education Building, listed on the NRHP in Hamilton County
First Baptist Church, Lauderdale, Memphis, Shelby County
First Baptist Church East Nashville, listed on the NRHP in Davidson County
First Baptist Church (Knoxville, Tennessee), listed on the NRHP in Knox County
First Baptist Church (Memphis, Tennessee), listed on the NRHP in Shelby County
First Baptist Church, Capitol Hill, Nashville, listed on the NRHP in Davidson County

Texas
First Baptist Church (Amarillo, Texas), listed on the NRHP in Potter County, Texas
First Baptist Church (Dallas), a Southern Baptist megachurch located in Dallas County
First Baptist Church (Stamford, Texas), listed on the NRHP in  Jones and Haskell Counties
First Baptist Church (Sutherland Springs, Texas), listed on the NRHP in Wilson County

Vermont
First Baptist Church (Burlington, Vermont), listed on the NRHP in Chittenden County

Virginia

First Baptist Church (Bristol, Virginia), listed on the NRHP in Virginia
First Baptist Church of Covington, Virginia, listed on the NRHP in Virginia
First Baptist Church (Farmville, Virginia), listed on the NRHP in Prince Edward County
First Baptist Church (Lexington, Virginia), listed on the NRHP in Virginia
First Baptist Church (Lynchburg, Virginia), listed on the NRHP in Virginia
First Baptist Church (Newport News, Virginia), listed on the NRHP in Virginia
First Baptist Church (Norfolk, Virginia), listed on the NRHP in Virginia
First Baptist Church (Petersburg, Virginia), listed on the NRHP in Virginia
First Baptist Church (Richmond, Virginia), listed on the NRHP in Virginia
First Baptist Church (Roanoke, Virginia), formerly listed on the NRHP, destroyed by fire in 1995
First Baptist Church (Williamsburg, Virginia), listed on the NRHP in Virginia

West Virginia
First Baptist Church (Parkersburg, West Virginia), listed on the NRHP in Wood County

Wisconsin
First Baptist Church of Fond du Lac, listed on the NRHP in Fond du Lac Countyn
First Baptist Church (Osceola, Wisconsin), listed on the NRHP in Polk County
First Baptist Church (Waukesha, Wisconsin), listed on the NRHP in Waukesha County

See also
Baptist Church
FBC (disambiguation)
Second Baptist Church (disambiguation)
Third Baptist Church (disambiguation)